Olcan is a Turkish and Irish given name for males. 

People named Olcan include:
 Olcan Adın, Turkish footballer
 Olcan McFetridge, Irish retired sportsperson
 Olcan ‘The Body’ Shaw, famous Irish Pintman

See also
 St. Olcan
 St Olcan's High School
 Olcán

Turkish masculine given names